Seapony is an American indie pop band from Seattle. They formed in 2010 and have released two albums on Hardly Art.

History
Seapony first attracted attention through four songs offered for free on Bandcamp. Their first release was the 3-song single, Dreaming, followed by their debut album, Go With Me, in 2011. Both of their albums have been recorded in a home studio. The trio are also known for their use of a drum machine in their recordings.
Seapony toured Europe and Japan in 2013.

On September 7, 2015, Seapony announced via Facebook that the band was breaking up. However the band teased fans with a return when a new EP was announced via Facebook, on August 18, 2017, titled Be Here Again.

Band members

 Jen Weidl – guitars, vocals
 Danny Rowland – guitar
 Ian Brewer – bass

Discography
 Dreaming EP (2010)
 Go With Me (2011)
 Sailing EP (2011)
 Falling (2012)
 A Vision (2015)
 Be Here Again EP (2017)

References

Indie pop groups from Washington (state)
Musical groups from Seattle
Hardly Art artists